Beautiful Curse is the sixth studio album by English rock band the Quireboys, released in 2013.

Track listing
Too Much of a Good Thing
 Chain Smokin’
Talk of the Town
Mother Mary
King of Fools
Homewreckers and Heartbreakers
Diamonds and Dirty Stones
Beautiful Curse
Don’t Fight It
For Crying Out Loud
Twenty Seven Years
 I Died Laughing

Charts

Personnel
 Jonathan "Spike" Gray – lead vocals
 Guy Griffin – lead guitar, rhythm guitar, backing vocals
 Paul Guerin – lead guitar, rhythm guitar, backing vocals
 Keith Weir – keyboards, backing vocals
 Dave McCluskey – drums
 Nick Malling – bass guitar

2013 albums
The Quireboys albums